HMP Isle of Wight is a super prison on the Isle of Wight, UK, combining the two island prisons, Albany and Parkhurst. On 1 April 2009, the two prisons (along with Camp Hill which closed in 2013) were merged with each site retaining their old names. Across the two sites there are over 1,000 prisoners making it one of the largest prisons in the country.

History
The idea for re-organising the three island prisons was suggested in October 2008 as a way of improving efficiency across the three sites. The plans attracted criticism from prison officers who feared for their jobs and claimed with fewer staff on duty, the safety of staff, inmates and the public was being put at risk. The chairman of the Prison Officer's Association claimed that the main aim of the move was to save around £1.1 million through natural wastage and scrapping eight principal officers' posts. On announcement of the proposals names for new prison were suggested as HMP Solent, HMP Mountbatten, HMP Vectis and the tongue-in-cheek suggestion "Barry Island" after the governor sent to implement the cluster Barry Greenberry who left in October 2010 to work for the private sector. However none of these new names were implemented and the new name HMP Isle of Wight was announced in March 2009. It was also stated that the individual sites would still retain their old names.

HMP Isle of Wight was officially launched on 1 April 2009. On the day of the launch the prison union slammed the move stating that it had only been done to save money, and would become more of a danger to the public. The Ministry of Justice stated that other similar schemes such as one in the Isle of Sheppey had proved a success and that although there would be a saving of around £1 million this was only being done through better economies and that there was no added danger to the public. The main motivation of "clustering", as the process is known, is cost cutting.

In May 2010 a man dressed as Snoopy and an accomplice failed in their attempt to enter the Albany site in the prison, trying to free a prisoner. The pistol the costumed man carried was a water gun. The person the men were trying to free was actually located in the Camp Hill site at the time.

In January 2013, the Ministry of Justice announced that the Camp Hill site of the prison would close, with a reduction of 595 places at the prison. The prison formally closed in March 2013.

Sites

References

External links 

 

I
Newport, Isle of Wight